Al Murar, commonly called Freej Al Murar, is a locality in Dubai, United Arab Emirates (UAE). Al Murar is located in eastern Dubai in Deira and is bordered by the Deira Corniche in the north, Naif in the south, Ayil Nasir to the west and Al Baraha to the east.
Famous Al Futtaim Mosque located in this area.

Routes D 92 (Al Khaleej Road) and D 82 (Naif Road) form the northern and southern peripheries around the localities.  Al Murar is a residential community in the heart of the Deira central business district. 

The name of the locality was derived from the name of the tribe that the majority of the previous resident families came from., and is commonly called Freej Al Murar.

References 

Communities in Dubai